Crissy Strimple is an American softball coach who is the current head coach at Tulsa.

Coaching career

Tulsa
On June 12, 2019, Tulsa promoted Strimple to head coach of the Tulsa softball program.

Head coaching record

College

References

Living people
American softball coaches
Female sports coaches
Tulsa Golden Hurricane softball players
Tulsa Golden Hurricane softball coaches
Central Arkansas Sugar Bears softball coaches
Year of birth missing (living people)
Northeastern Oklahoma A&M Golden Norsemen and Lady Norse athletes